This is a list of the National Register of Historic Places listings in Yakutat, Alaska.

This is intended to be a complete list of the properties and districts on the National Register of Historic Places in Yakutat, Alaska, United States.  The locations of National Register properties and districts for which the latitude and longitude coordinates are included below, may be seen in a Google map.

There is 1 property listed on the National Register in the city and borough, which is also a National Historic Landmark.

Current listings

|}

See also 

 List of National Historic Landmarks in Alaska
 National Register of Historic Places listings in Alaska

References 

 
Yakutat